Pike's Stockade is a historic exploration campsite located near Sanford, Colorado.  Set on the north bank of the Conejos River, it is where explorer Zebulon Pike raised the American flag on Spanish soil in 1807.  The site, now managed by Historic Colorado, includes a reconstruction of a wooden stockade, built according to Pike's detailed description of the original.  The site was declared a National Historic Landmark in 1961.

Description and history
Now a small park, the site is now less forested than it was at the time of Pike's expedition. The stockade is built out of oak, a longer-lasting material than the cottonwood Pike used in 1807. Like Pike's construction, the stockade has no normal doorways, and is entered through a tunnel that passes under one of the walls. In deference to public access, the tunnel is lined in concrete, and the stockade itself is built on a concrete foundation.

Zebulon Pike led one of several exploratory expeditions commissioned by President Thomas Jefferson following the Louisiana Purchase to understand what exactly had been acquired.  His expedition left St. Louis in July 1806, and reached this point in January 1807.  The fort was built primarily as a defense against attack from the Spanish, on whose territory Pike had (either knowingly or innocently) encroached.  On February 26, a force of 100 Spanish cavalry arrived at the fort, and requested that he come to Santa Fe, the territorial capital, to discuss the matter.  Pike and his men went with the Spanish force, and were eventually released in July 1807.

See also
List of National Historic Landmarks in Colorado
National Register of Historic Places listings in Conejos County, Colorado

References

External links

Fort Garland Museum & Pike's Stockade History Colorado
Pike's Stockade  National Historic Landmarks Program

Infrastructure completed in 1807
National Historic Landmarks in Colorado
Buildings and structures in Conejos County, Colorado
History Colorado
Buildings and structures on the National Register of Historic Places in Colorado
National Register of Historic Places in Conejos County, Colorado